"Wild Horses" is a song co-written by Bill Shore and David Wills, recorded by American country music artist Garth Brooks on his breakthrough album No Fences in 1990. The song was not released as a single until November 2000, when it was released with a re-recorded vocal track. It peaked at #7 on the Billboard Hot Country Singles & Tracks chart.

Content
On the surface, this song is about a cowboy's struggle between the love of the rodeo life and the love of a woman. He repeatedly promises to her that he will quit riding, but repeatedly breaks these promises because "wild horses keep dragging [him] away." As the song progresses he's preparing to "make her one more promise that [he] can't keep." It can be interpreted to be about a man who is repeatedly unfaithful and is forgiven, but knows his significant other will eventually stop forgiving him ("The way I love the rodeo / I guess I should let her go / before I hurt her more than she loves me").

Chart performance

Year-end charts

References

1990 songs
2000 singles
Garth Brooks songs
Song recordings produced by Allen Reynolds
Songs written by David Wills (singer)
Capitol Records Nashville singles
Songs written by Bill Shore